Yoana Calderón González (born 20 September 1994) is a Cuban footballer who plays as a forward for the Cuba women's national team.

External links 
 

1994 births
Living people
Cuban women's footballers
Cuba women's international footballers
Women's association football forwards